Gamers 4 Croydon (G4C) was a minor political party in South Australia which contested the 2010 state election. The party disbanded shortly after the election and endorsed the Australian Sex Party and the Greens as possible replacements for support.

History
The party had a strong anti-censorship message, particularly relating to the lack of an R18+ classification for video games in Australia. Founded in late 2009 and registered in 2010, its aim was to unseat South Australian Attorney-General Michael Atkinson from his seat of Croydon in the House of Assembly (lower house). Atkinson, having stepped down from the position of South Australian Attorney-General after the election was the only state Attorney-General who opposed the introduction of an R18+ classification, and was largely responsible for its absence, as to introduce such a rating required the unanimous approval of all Attorneys-General. Atkinson's successor, John Rau, took a different view and supported the introduction of an R18+ classification.

Electoral results

2010 SA election
The party ran six candidates at the 2010 South Australian state election.  Kat Nicholson, a postgraduate journalism student, ran for the seat of Croydon.  David Egge ran for the seat of Norwood, Tom Birdseye ran for the seat of Adelaide, Matthew Allpress ran for the seat of Light, and Ben Ernst ran for the seat of Mawson.  Party president and software engineer Chris Prior ran for the Legislative Council (upper house).

In the lower house, the party performed best in Croydon (3.7 percent) and worst in Light (1.0 percent). In the upper house, the party received 0.8 percent (7994 votes) of the statewide vote. No candidates were elected.

References

External links
 Gamers 4 Croydon
 Official Gamers 4 Croydon YouTube channel

Political parties in South Australia
Video game organizations